Miluo is a county-level city in Hunan province, China, it is under the administration of the prefecture-level city of Yueyang. The city is located on the northeast of the province and on the eastern bank of the Xiang River, it is to the north of the city proper of Changsha City. Miluo is bordered to the north by Yueyang County, to the east by Pingxiang County, to the south by Changsha County and Wangcheng District of Changsha City, to the west by Xiangyin County and Yuanjiang City. The city has three subdistricts and 10 towns under its jurisdiction. the government seat is Guiyi.

Miluo City is named after the River of Miluo, which is a tributary in the lower reaches of the Xiang River. Miluo River is known that it is the source place of Dragon Boat Festival.

Administrative divisions
According to the result on adjustment of township-level administrative divisions of Miluo city on December 3, 2015, Miluo city has one subdistrict, one township and 17 towns under its jurisdiction, they are:

1 subdistrict
 Tianwen, Miluo (Quyuan mgmt Dist)

1 township
 Fenghuang, Miluo (Quyuan mgmt Dist)

17 towns
 Baishui, Miluo
 Baitang, Miluo
 Bishi, Miluo
 Changle, Miluo
 Chuanshanping
 Dajing, Miluo
 Guiyi
 Gupei
 Heshi, Miluo (Quyuan mgmt Dist)
 Luojiang, Miluo
 Miluo town
 Quzici
 Sanjiang, Miluo
 Shendingshan
 Taolinshi
 Xinshi, Miluo
 Yingtian, Miluo (Quyuan mgmt Dist)

Climate

References

External links
Official website of Miluo Government

 
Cities in Hunan
Yueyang